Desmodium elegans is a species of flowering plants in the family Fabaceae. It is found in Asia (Afghanistan, Bhutan, China, India, Kashmir, Nepal, Pakistan).

References

External links 
 	
 
 Desmodium elegans at eflora.org (Flora of China)

elegans
Plants described in 1825
Flora of Afghanistan
Flora of the Indian subcontinent
Flora of China